"This Is the World We Live In" is a song by Swedish band Alcazar. The song is the fifth single from their second album, Alcazarized (2003). It was released in 2004 and became a hit, peaking at number three in Sweden, number one in Hungary, and reaching the top 20 in Flemish Belgium, Denmark, Italy, Norway and the United Kingdom. The song contains an interpolation of Diana Ross's "Upside Down", and the chorus is adapted from the Genesis song "Land of Confusion".

Music video
A music video was produced to promote the single.

Track listings
 Swedish and European CD single
 "This Is the World We Live In" (radio edit)
 "This Is the World We Live In" (extended version)

 UK CD single
 "This Is the World We Live In" (radio edit) – 3:34
 "This Is the World We Live In" (extended mix) – 5:57
 "This Is the World We Live In" (Soundfactory Club Anthem) – 9:06
 "This Is the World We Live In" (Almighty Mix) – 7:44
 "This Is the World We Live In" (Soundtrack Drama Dub) – 9:38

 Australian CD single
 "This Is the World We Live In" (original)
 "This Is the World We Live In" (extended version)
 "This Is the World We Live In" (Soundfactory Club Anthem)
 "This Is the World We Live In" (Almighty Mix)
 "This Is the World We Live In" (Almighty radio edit)

Charts

Weekly charts

Year-end charts

Certifications

Release history

References

Alcazar (band) songs
2003 songs
2004 singles
RCA Records singles
Songs written by Anoo Bhagavan
Songs written by Bernard Edwards
Songs written by Jonas von der Burg
Songs written by Mike Rutherford
Songs written by Nile Rodgers
Songs written by Phil Collins
Songs written by Tony Banks (musician)